Jean-Clément Jeanbart (born on 3 March 1943 in Aleppo, Syria) is a Melkite archbishop, who currently serves as the Archbishop of the Melkite Greek Catholic Archeparchy of Aleppo and Apostolic Visitor in Western Europe of the Greek Melkites.

Life
Jean-Clément Jeanbart was ordained to the priesthood on April 15, 1968, and was consecrated as Chaplain of the Aleppinian Basilians. He was appointed to succeed the deceased Néophytos Edelby as Archbishop of Aleppo on August 2, 1995. The Patriarch of Antioch Maximos V Hakim ordained him to the episcopacy on September 16, 1995,  assisted by co-consecrators, Archbishops François Abou Mokh BS and Habib Bacha SMSP. Jeanbart was appointed Apostolic Visitor in Western Europe of the Greek Melkites in 1999. He served as a principal co-consecrator for the consecration of Archbishop Nikolaki Sawaf of Latakia on March 4, 2000. After the outbreak of Syrian Civil War in Syria in August 2012, his residence was in Aleppo.

In October, 2015, he pleaded with the UK government to stop backing opposition forces in the Syrian Civil War. He stated that the war was "a contest between a modern secular state and jihadis who were destroying its culture and massacring religious minorities."

When Patriarch Gregory III Laham resigned on May 6, 2017, Jeanbart became administrator of the Melkite Greek Catholic Church until the election of the new Patriarch Youssef Absi.

In October 2019, Jeanbart said that the Turkish offensive into north-eastern Syria is "another source of violence we would rather have done without." Jeanbart said this is concerning because it will in fact  lead to the creation of an extra-territorial pocket within another nation.

Relations with Islam in the Middle East
At the Special Assembly of the Synod of Bishops (Catholic) for the Middle East, Jeanbart said, "I suggest (given the emigration of Christians) to spread optimism among our faithful about their future in the country. Our countries are yet not without resources and values! Let us learn to be friends of our Muslim brothers; helping them to open to us!"

References

External links

 http://www.catholic-hierarchy.org/bishop/bjeanbart.html
 https://web.archive.org/web/20150220045459/http://www.bistum-eichstaett.de/en/aktuell/20101018-20-das-collegium-orientale-stellt-sich-in-rom-vor-oekumenische-begegnungen-am-rand-der-bischofssynode/
 http://christian-orient.eu/beitrage/die-katholischen-kirchen-byzantinischer-tradition/
 https://web.archive.org/web/20110519230607/http://www.pgc-lb.org/english/Church3.shtml#Aleppo
 https://web.archive.org/web/20190420175825/http://www.apostolische-nachfolge.de/asien2.htm

1943 births
Melkite Greek Catholic bishops
Syrian archbishops
Syrian Melkite Greek Catholics
Living people
People from Aleppo
Eastern Catholic bishops in Syria